Ringing the Changes is a 1929 British silent comedy film directed by Leslie S. Hiscott and starring Henry Edwards, Charles Cantley, James Fenton and Margot Landa. It was based on a novel by Raleigh King. The screenplay concerns an aristocrat who poses as a butler in order to expose a dishonest lawyer.

Cast
 Henry Edwards as Lord Bamerton
 Margot Landa as Jill Farrar
 James Fenton as Stinson
 Forrester Harvey as Steve Blower
 Philip Hewland as Mr Guggleswick
 Barbara Gott as Mrs Guggleswick
 Rex Maurice as Henry Foxley
 Jeff Barlow as Dorcas
 Charles Cantley

References

External links

1929 films
British comedy films
1929 comedy films
British silent feature films
1920s English-language films
Films directed by Leslie S. Hiscott
Films shot at Twickenham Film Studios
British black-and-white films
1920s British films
Silent comedy films